Smouldering myeloma is a disease classified as intermediate in a spectrum of step-wise progressive diseases termed plasma cell dyscrasias. In this spectrum of diseases, a clone of plasma cells secreting monoclonal paraprotein (also termed myeloma protein or M protein) causes the relatively benign disease of monoclonal gammopathy of undetermined significance. This clone proliferates and may slowly evolve into more aggressive sub-clones that cause smouldering multiple myeloma. Further and more rapid evolution causes the overtly malignant stage of multiple myeloma and can subsequently lead to the extremely malignant stage of secondary plasma cell leukemia. Thus, some patients with smouldering myeloma progress to multiple myeloma and plasma cell leukemia. Smouldering myeloma, however, is not a malignant disease. It is characterised as a pre-malignant disease that lacks symptoms but is associated with bone marrow biopsy showing the presence of an abnormal number of clonal myeloma cells, blood and/or urine containing a myeloma protein, and a significant risk of developing into a malignant disease.

Diagnosis
Smouldering myeloma is characterised by:
 Serum paraprotein >30 g/L or urinary monoclonal protein ≥500 mg per 24 h AND/OR
 Clonal plasma cells >10% and <60% on bone marrow biopsy AND
 No evidence of end organ damage that can be attributed to plasma cell disorder AND
 No myeloma-defining event (>60% plasma cells in bone marrow OR Involved/Uninvolved light chain ratio>100)

Treatment
Treatment for multiple myeloma is focused on therapies that decrease the clonal plasma cell population and consequently decrease the signs and symptoms of disease. If the disease is completely asymptomatic (i.e. there is a paraprotein and an abnormal bone marrow population but no end-organ damage), as in smouldering myeloma, treatment is typically deferred, or restricted to clinical trials.

They are generally responsive to IL-1β neutralisation.

Prognosis
Smouldering myeloma with an increasingly abnormal serum free light chain (FLC) ratio is associated with a higher risk for progression to active multiple myeloma.

References

Further reading

 
 
 
 
 

Hematologic malignant neoplasms